Old Ravenswood School, also known as "1887 School," was a historic school building located at Ravenswood, Jackson County, West Virginia. It was built in 1887–1888, and was a two-story brick building with an irregular hipped roof with a truncated tower that, until 1971, supported a belfry. The school closed in 1968. The school has been demolished.

It was listed on the National Register of Historic Places in 1979.

References

Defunct schools in West Virginia
Demolished buildings and structures in West Virginia
Educational institutions disestablished in 1968
Former school buildings in the United States
National Register of Historic Places in Jackson County, West Virginia
School buildings completed in 1888
Schools in Jackson County, West Virginia
School buildings on the National Register of Historic Places in West Virginia